The comet moth or Madagascan moon moth (Argema mittrei). is a moth native to the rain forests of Madagascar. The species was first described by Félix Édouard Guérin-Méneville in 1847. The adult moth cannot feed and only lives for 4 to 5 days. Although endangered in the wild due to habitat loss, the comet moth has been bred in captivity.

Physical features 
There are physical differences among females and males. Females have more rounded wings. The male has a wingspan of 20 cm (7.9 inches) and a tail span of 15  cm (5.9 inches), making it one of the world's largest silk moths. The males have a long, feathery antennas and the females have thin antennas. Argema mittrei wings have large eyespot, giving the appearance of a large and dangerous creature that should not be attacked.

Host plants 
Host plants include the genus Eugenia and Weinmannia, as well as Eucalyptus gunnii and Liquidambar. Other host plants they are reared to are Eugenia cuneifolia, Sclerocarya birrea, Weinmania eriocampa, Rhus cotinus, Schinus terebinthifolia, and Schinus molle. Additional host plants are Cotinus coggygria, Eucalyptus gunnii, Malosma laurina, Pistacia terebinthus, Pistacia lentiscus, Rhus copallinum, Rhus typhina, Schinus molle, Schinus terebinthifolius, Toxicodendron pubescens, Mimosa species and Liquidambar styraciflua.

Cocoon 
The adult moth lays 100 to 150 eggs. The caterpillar has the unique ability to spin a silk cocoon. The pupa is a life stage where some insects undergo transformation between immature and mature stages.

Pupa 
The pupa is enclosed in a grayish-white cocoon that resembles a sac. The cocoon has drainage holes so rainwater can escape.

Silk production 
Argema mittrei produces natural silk cocoons. For Argema mittrei, the cocoon has a silvery color with a rough and compact opening at one end.

Ultrasound 
Moths and bats have been in a coevolutionary arms race due to bats developing echolocation. However, moths have developed methods to avoid detection from the echolocation cries of bats and to promote survival once detected. For Argema mittrei, they have the ability to use ultrasound absorption so that the bat will receive a dampened echo, making the moth invisible to the bat. Using ultrasound absorption is Argema mittrei main defensive function. It also has other defensive roles such as crypsis, aposematism, or mimicry. It also has a striking long, red and yellow tail which is used in defense against attackers.

Gallery

References

Saturniinae
Wild silk
Endemic fauna of Madagascar
Lepidoptera of Madagascar
Moths of Madagascar
Moths of Africa